Thunder Warrior II is an Italian action film written and directed  by Fabrizio De Angelis. It is the sequel to the film Thunder Warrior. The film is about a native American sheriff named Thunder, who is transferred to a small town in the desert, and finds out collusion between organised criminals and corrupt officials.

Cast

Release
Thunder 2 was released on home video in West Germany in March 1987.

Reception
From contemporary reviews, a review in the German film almanac Fischer Film Almnach declared that the film had more action and slow motion shots than the first film, but it just as much poor quality direction, script and acting.
A reviewer credited as "Lor." of Variety reviewed the film on Trans World Entertainment video cassette on June 9, 1987. "Lor." described the film as "photogenic if uneventful sequel" noting that Monument Valley was a "lovely backgrop for this nonsense, rendered a bit hard to take by the pidgin English dialog".

References

Sources

External links
 

Italian action films
1987 action films
English-language Italian films
Films directed by Fabrizio De Angelis
Neo-Western films
1980s Italian films